Bertram is a city in Burnet County, Texas, United States. The population was 1,353 at the 2010 census.

Geography

History
Bertram is at the junction of Farm Roads 243 and 1174 and State Highway 29, ten miles east of Burnet in eastern Burnet County. The town was established in 1882, when the community of San Gabriel (near the San Gabriel River) in Burnet County was moved two miles northwest to the newly constructed Austin and Northwestern Railroad. The new community was named for Austin merchant Rudolph Bertram, the largest stockholder in the Austin and Northwestern. A post office opened in 1882 and, by 1891, the town had an estimated population of 150, a cotton gin-gristmill, three general stores, a grocer, a blacksmith, a shoemaker, and two wagonmakers. After 1900, Bertram was a shipping point for cotton, cattle, and wool. In 1928, a record 11,624 bales of cotton were ginned in the town.

In the early 1930s, plummeting cotton prices and the Great Depression caused the town's population to decline from a high of 1,000 in 1929 to 550 by 1931. It was 600 in 1949 and, by 1966, stood at 1,205. In 1989, the town had an estimated population of 1,002 and nineteen businesses. At that time, Bertram's principal industries included the manufacture of ceramic floor tiles, paving tiles, marble fixtures, and vacuum-formed and molded plastic products. In 1990, the census population was 849.

The Major League Baseball player (Owen) Chief Wilson lived in Bertram. The local baseball field is named for him.

Demographics

2020 census

As of the 2020 United States census, there were 1,616 people, 632 households, and 478 families residing in the city.

2000 census
At the 2000 census, there were 1,122 people, 387 households and 280 families residing in the city. The racial make-up was 88.24% White, 0.89% African American, 0.62% Native American, 0.09% Pacific Islander, 9.09% from other races and 1.07% from two or more races. Hispanic or Latino of any race were 21.21% of the population.

There were 387 households, of which 36.2% had children under the age of 18 living with them, 62.0% were married couples living together, 7.2% had a female householder with no husband present, and 27.4% were non-families. 25.6% of all households were made up of individuals, and 13.7% had someone living alone who was 65 years of age or older. The average household size was 2.69 and the average family size was 3.24.

24.6% of the population were under the age of 18, 8.7% from 18 to 24, 27.5% from 25 to 44, 20.7% from 45 to 64 and 18.5% were 65 years of age or older. The median age was 37 years. For every 100 females, there were 90.2 males. For every 100 females age 18 and over, there were 88.8 males.

The median household income was $36,250 and the median family income was $42,031. Males had a median income of $29,688 and females $20,179. The per capita income for the city was $14,132. About 7.0% of families and 8.3% of the population were below the poverty line, including 8.3% of those under age 18 and 22.0% of those age 65 or over.

Culture
Bertram hosts an annual "Oatmeal Festival" during the Labor Day weekend. Named after the remains of the nearby community of Oatmeal, it includes a number of activities that draw attendees from all over central Texas.

The Oatmeal Festival began in 1978 as a spoof of the many chili cook-offs in the state of Texas. Ken Odiorne, who had lived in the Oatmeal community, was the first organizer, with National Oats, the makers of 3 Minutes Oats, as a sponsor.

Over the years, the money raised has built an open-air pavilion in Bertram and a community center at Oatmeal. Scholarships are given to local high school graduates every year. Financial assistance has been given to many local events including the Easter Egg Hunt, Santa's Workshop and Burnet County Livestock Show.

Education
Bertram is served by the Burnet Consolidated Independent School District. In 2007, Bertram Elementary School was named a National Blue Ribbon School.

Climate
The climate in this area is characterized by hot, humid summers and generally mild to cold winters.  According to the Köppen Climate Classification system, Bertram has a humid subtropical climate, abbreviated "Cfa" on climate maps.

Photo Gallery

References

External links
 Bertram community website
 

Cities in Burnet County, Texas
Cities in Texas